Jamia Amjadia Rizvia is an Islamic seminary (Madrasa) of the Sunni denomination situated in Ghosi city in Indian state of Uttar Pradesh.It was established by Mufti Ziaul Mustafa Azmi a north Indian  Muhaddith and son of a 19th century Faqih Mufti Amjad Ali Aazmi.

See also
Jamiatur Raza
Akhtar Raza Khan
Manzar-e-Islam
Al Jamiatul Ashrafia
Al-Jame-atul-Islamia

References

Islamic universities and colleges in India
Madrasas in India
Universities and colleges in Uttar Pradesh
Mau district
1982 establishments in Uttar Pradesh